Wergeland is a crater on Mercury. Its name was adopted by the International Astronomical Union in 1976, after the Norwegian poet Henrik Arnold Wergeland.

Hollows are present within Wergeland.

The peak-ring basin Chekhov is to the west of Wergeland.

References

Impact craters on Mercury